Godhead (from Middle English godhede, "godhood", and unrelated to the modern word "head"), may refer to:
 Deity 
 Divinity
 Conceptions of God
 In Abrahamic religions
 Godhead in Judaism, the unknowable aspect of God, which lies beyond actions or emanations
 Godhead in Christianity, the substantial essence or nature of the Christian God
 Godhead in Islam

 God in Hinduism
 Brahman, the divine source of being, through which all emanates
 Paramātmā, the "oversoul" spiritually identical with the absolute and ultimate reality
 Svayam Bhagavan or Supreme Personality of Godhead, the divine person from whom all emanates
 Trimūrti, the cosmic trinity of Trideva (Brahmā, Viṣhṇu, and Śhiva) or Tridevi (Sarasvatī, Lakṣmī, and Pārvatī)

Other uses:
 Godhead (band), an American industrial rock band
 Godhead (album), an album by Scottish dream pop band Lowlife
 "Godhead", the second single taken from Nitzer Ebb's 1991 album Ebbhead
 Krishna, the Supreme Personality of Godhead, a book by A. C. Bhaktivedanta Swami Prabhupada
 Godhead Trilogy, science fiction series by James K. Morrow published 1994–1999